The 1926 United States Senate elections were elections for the United States Senate that occurred in the middle of Republican President Calvin Coolidge's second term. The 32 seats of Class 3 were contested in regular elections, and special elections were held to fill vacancies. The Republican majority was reduced by seven seats.

Gains, losses, and holds

Retirements
One Republican and one Democrat retired instead of seeking re-election.

Defeats
Twelve Republicans sought re-election but lost in the primary or general election.

Death
One Republican died on August 23rd, 1926 and his seat remained vacant until the election.

Change in composition

Before the elections 
At the beginning of 1926.

Elections results

At the beginning of the next Congress

Race summaries

Special elections during the 69th Congress 
In these special elections, the winners were seated during 1926 or before March 4, 1927; ordered by election date.

Elections leading to the 70th Congress 
In these general elections, the winners were elected for the term beginning March 4, 1927; ordered by state.

All of the elections involved the Class 3 seats.

Closest races 
Twelve races had a margin of victory under 10%:

Alabama

Arizona

Arkansas

California

Colorado

Connecticut

Florida

Georgia

Idaho

Illinois

Indiana 

There were 2 elections in Indiana due to the October 14, 1925, death of Democrat Samuel M. Ralston.

Indiana (special) 

Republican Arthur Raymond Robinson was appointed to continue Ralston's term, pending the special election, which he then won.

Indiana (regular)

Iowa

Iowa (special)

Iowa (regular)

Kansas

Kentucky

Louisiana

Maine (special)

Maryland

Massachusetts (special)

Missouri 

There were 2 elections on the same day for the same seat, due to the May 16, 1925, death of Republican Selden P. Spencer.

Republican George H. Williams was appointed May 25, 1925, to continue the term, epending a special election.  Williams ran in both the special election to finish the term and the regular election to the next term, but lost both races to Democrat Harry B. Hawes.

Missouri (special)

Missouri (regular)

Nevada

New Hampshire

New York

North Carolina

North Dakota 

There were two elections due to the June 22, 1925, death of one-term Republican Edwin F. Ladd.  Republican Gerald Nye was appointed November 14, 1925, to continue the term, pending a special election.  Nye later won the June 1926 special election to finish the term and the November 1926 general election to the next term.

North Dakota (special) 

Nye was elected on the Nonpartisan League ticket, but served as a Republican.

North Dakota (regular)

Ohio

Oklahoma

Oregon

Pennsylvania

South Carolina

South Dakota

Utah

Vermont

Washington

Wisconsin

See also
 1926 United States elections
 1926 United States gubernatorial elections
1926 United States House of Representatives elections
 69th United States Congress
 70th United States Congress

Notes

References